The term international crisis is a widespread term without a single common definition.   To some, it involves "a sequence of interactions between the governments of two or more sovereign states in severe conflict, short of actual war, but involving the perception of a dangerously high probability of war".

Types
Lebow gives a breakdown of three types of international crises:
 Justification of Hostilities. One of the nations decides, before the crisis starts, to go to war and constructs a crisis to justify it. The pattern of justification is almost always the same: Rouse public opinion, make impossible demands, try to legitimize the demands, deny your real intentions then employ the rejection of the demands as a reason for war. A recent example, commonly employed by critics of George W. Bush, is the Iraq disarmament crisis, which precipitated the Iraq War.
 Spinoff Crisis. The nations are involved in a war or crisis with another nation or nations and this precipitates another crisis, e.g. the Lusitania incident in 1915.
 Brinkmanship. Intentionally forcing a crisis to get the other side to back down. The Cuban Missile Crisis of 1962 is a well-known example of brinkmanship.

With the exception of a justification of hostilities, the study of international crises assumes that neither side actually wants to go to war, but must be visibly prepared to do so. In the words of Groucho Marx, "Always be sincere, even if you don't mean it".

Strategies
George's book presents an overview of the process and conflicting goals of crisis management as well as many examples. He discusses a number of strategies, including:

Offensive strategies
blackmail
limited and reversible response
controlled pressure
attrition
fait accompli

Defensive strategies
coercion
limited escalation
tit-for-tat
test of capabilities
"drawing a line"
 buying time strategy
 conveying commitment and resolve to avoid miscalculation by the adversary

List of defused crises
International crises tend to result in war, almost by definition; they are then remembered best not as crises but as causes of wars. For information on international crises that resulted immediately in war, see List of wars

Given the above, some of the crises that are best-known as crises were defused. The following crises did not immediately provoke large-scale violence, but set off anger in countries:

 War in sight crisis (1875)
Samoan Crisis (1887-1889), between the United States of America, England, and Germany
 Anglo-Portuguese Crisis (1889–1890)
 Venezuelan crisis of 1895, between Venezuela and the United Kingdom
 Fashoda Incident (1898–1899)
Baltimore Crisis (1891-1892)
Venezuelan crisis of 1902–03, between Venezuela and Britain, Germany and Italy
 First Moroccan Crisis (1904–1906)
Dutch–Venezuelan crisis of 1908, between Venezuela and the Netherlands
 Bosnian crisis (1908–1909)
 Agadir Crisis (1911)
 Åland crisis (1916–1920)
 Remilitarization of the Rhineland (1936)
 Anschluss (1938)
 May Crisis (1938)
 Sudetenland Crisis (1938)
Levant Crisis (1945) between the United Kingdom and Syria, France
 Iran crisis (1946–1947)
 Berlin Blockade (1948–1949)
 Berlin Crisis of 1961
 Cuban Missile Crisis (1962)
 Pueblo incident (1968)
 Damansky Island Crisis (1969)
 1973 Chilean coup
 Axe Murder Incident (1976)
 Beagle conflict (1978)
 Iran hostage crisis (1979)
 Able Archer 83 (1983)
 Caldas' crisis (1987)

Ongoing crises
Korean conflict (1945-ongoing)
North Korea and weapons of mass destruction
Israeli–Palestinian conflict  (1947-ongoing)
Indo-Pakistani wars and conflicts (1947-ongoing)
Territorial disputes in the South China Sea (1950s-ongoing)
Cyprus problem (1963-ongoing)
Iran–Saudi Arabia proxy conflict (1979-ongoing)
Iraqi conflict (2003-ongoing)
Crisis in Venezuela (2010-ongoing)
Libyan conflict (2011-ongoing)
Syrian Civil War (2011-ongoing)
Uyghur genocide (2014-ongoing)
Russo-Ukrainian war (2014-ongoing)
Yemeni Civil War (2015-ongoing)
Rohingya genocide (2017-ongoing)
 Lebanese crisis (2019-ongoing)

See also
Diplomacy
International relations
The UN
World Bank
G-20
Negotiation
Crisis
Crisis management
:Category:Wikipedia categories named after diplomatic crises

References

 Snyder, Glenn H. and Diesing, Paul: 1977. Conflict Among Nations: Bargaining, Decision Making and System Structure in International Crises. 
 Lebow, Richard N.:1981. Between Peace and War: The Nature of International Crisis. 
George, Alexander L (ed): 1991. Avoiding War: Problems of Crisis Management.

External links
International Crisis Behavior Project's Data Viewer Searchable analyses of 487 crises from 1918 to 2017

Causes of war
Crisis
International relations terminology